Children With AIDS Charity was a national UK charity to help children infected or affected by HIV/AIDS maintain a good quality of life. CWAC was set up in 1992 with the aim of "working towards a future without poverty or prejudice for these children and their families". CWAC closed in 2014.

Founding
Children With AIDS Charity was founded in October 1993 by Rebecca Handel, Jo Dodge, and the paediatric team of St Mary’s Hospital in Paddington. Together they decided that a charity should be formed that could respond to the specific practical, emotional and educational requirements of children and their families infected and affected by HIV.

Rebecca contracted HIV through a blood transfusion in her second pregnancy, before blood was screened for the virus in 1981. Since she was white, middle-class and Jewish, Rebecca did not meet any of the HIV-positive stereotypes at the time. Bonnie Handel, Rebecca’s daughter from that pregnancy, died in St Mary’s Hospital the following December; Rebecca Handel died on 1 January 1995.

References

Health charities in the United Kingdom
HIV/AIDS in the United Kingdom